The Electronic Signatures Directive 1999/93/EC was a European Union directive on the use of electronic signatures (e-signatures) in electronic contracts within the European Union (EU).

It was repealed by the eIDAS regulation on 1 July 2016.

Contents
The central provision of the directive is article 5, which requires that electronic signatures are regarded as equivalent to written signatures.

Related acts
Communication from the Commission to the Council, the European Parliament, the European Economic and Social Committee and the Committee of the Regions “Action Plan on e-signatures and e-identification to facilitate the provision of cross-border public services in the Single Market” [COM(2008) 798 final – Not published in the Official Journal]
Commission report of 15 March 2006 on the operation of Directive 1999/93/EC on a Community framework for electronic signatures [COM(2006) 120 final – not published in the Official Journal].
Commission Decision 2003/511/EC of 14 July 2003 on the publication of reference numbers of generally recognised standards for electronic signature products in accordance with Directive 1999/93/EC of the European Parliament and of the Council [Official Journal L 175, 15 July 2003]
Commission Decision 2000/709/EC of 6 November 2000 on the minimum criteria to be taken into account by Member States when designating bodies in accordance with Article 3(4) of Directive 1999/93/EC of the European Parliament and of the Council on a Community framework for electronic signatures [Official Journal L 289 of 16 November 2000]

Implementation

See also
 Digital signatures and law#European Union and the European Economic Area
 Electronic signature
 United States Electronic Signatures in Global and National Commerce Act

External links
 http://eur-lex.europa.eu/legal-content/EN/TXT/?uri=CELEX:31999L0093 – EUR-Lex multi-lingual documents on Directive 1999/93/EC
 https://www.docusign.com/eu-esignature-directive – Docusign article on Directive 1999/93/EC

References

European Union directives
1999 in law
1999 in the European Union
English contract law